"Sweet Baby" is a song by American singer Macy Gray featuring American singer Erykah Badu, released as the lead single from Gray's second studio album, The Id (2001). John Frusciante of Red Hot Chili Peppers provides the song's guitars while R&B musician Billy Preston plays the organ. The UK CD and cassette formats contains a previously unreleased track named "Better Where You Are" as a B-side.

"Sweet Baby" peaked at number 23 on the UK Singles Chart, becoming Gray's third-highest-charting single there, behind "Still" and "I Try". The single also reached number 12 in New Zealand, number 16 in Canada, number 18 in Italy, and number 39 in Australia, as well as number 24 on the Hot Adult Top 40 Tracks chart in the United States.

Track listings

 UK CD single
 "Sweet Baby" (featuring Erykah Badu) – 3:48
 "Sweet Baby" (8 Jam remix featuring Erykah Badu) – 5:46
 "Better Where You Are" – 4:17
 "Sweet Baby" (video)

 UK 12-inch single
A1. "Sweet Baby" (8 Jam remix featuring Erykah Badu) – 5:46
B1. "Hey Young World Part 2" (featuring Slick Rick) – 4:01
B2. "Sweet Baby" (featuring Erykah Badu) – 3:55

 UK cassette single
 "Sweet Baby" (featuring Erykah Badu) – 3:48
 "Sweet Baby" (8 Jam remix featuring Erykah Badu) – 5:46
 "Better Where You Are" – 4:17

 European CD single
 "Sweet Baby" (featuring Erykah Badu) – 3:48
 "Better Where You Are" – 4:17

 Australian CD single
 "Sweet Baby" (album version featuring Erykah Badu)
 "Better Where You Are"
 "Que Sera" (live from Wembley)
 "If This Is Luv" (demo)

Credits and personnel
Credits are taken from The Id album booklet.

Studios
 Recorded at various studios in Hollywood, Philadelphia, and Chicago
 Mixed at various studios in Hollywood and New York City
 Mastered at Sony Music Studios (New York City)

Personnel

 Macy Gray – lyrics, production
 Joe Solo – music
 Erykah Badu – guest vocals, vocal arrangement
 John Frusciante – guitar
 Dave Wilder – bass
 Zac Rae – piano, Chamberlin
 Billy Preston – organ
 Jeremy Ruzumna – organ
 Darren Johnson – Rhodes
 Keefus Ciancia – Farfisa
 Victor Indrizzo – drums
 Marina Bambino – percussion
 Charles Veal Jr. – string arrangement
 Rick Rubin – vocal arrangement
 Darryl Swann – production, engineering, programming
 Dave Way – mixing
 Thom Russo – Pro Tools engineering
 Vlado Meller – mastering

Charts

Weekly charts

Year-end charts

Release history

References

2001 singles
2001 songs
Epic Records singles
Erykah Badu songs
Macy Gray songs
Music videos directed by Dave Meyers (director)
Songs written by Macy Gray